is a Japanese football player for Thespakusatsu Gunma.

Career
After attending University of Tsukuba, Kitagawa joined Montedio Yamagata in January 2018.

Club statistics
Updated to end of 2018 season.

References

External links

Profile at J. League
Profile at Montedio Yamagata

1995 births
Living people
Association football people from Mie Prefecture
Japanese footballers
J2 League players
J3 League players
Montedio Yamagata players
Giravanz Kitakyushu players
Thespakusatsu Gunma players
Association football forwards